is a Japanese rower. He competed at the 1984 Summer Olympics and the 1988 Summer Olympics.

References

1962 births
Living people
Japanese male rowers
Olympic rowers of Japan
Rowers at the 1984 Summer Olympics
Rowers at the 1988 Summer Olympics
Place of birth missing (living people)